Lukrezia Luise "Luc" Jochimsen, née Lukrezia Schleussinger (born 1 March 1936), is a German sociologist, television journalist, and politician of The Left party.

Professional career

Luc Jochimsen was born in Nuremberg, the daughter of a vehicle dealer. Her schooling in Frankfurt am Main ended in 1956.  She studied sociology, political science, and philosophy at the University of Hamburg. In 1961 she became a doctor of philosophy at the University of Münster.

She was from 1961 to 1975 a freelance author, and from 1975 to 1985 presenter of the TV programme Panorama in Hamburg.  From 1985 to 1988 she was the ARD London correspondent.  From 1988 to 1991 she was responsible for the department of documentaries of NDR and from 1991 until 1993 she led the ARD television studios in London. From 1994 to 2001 she was the chief editor of television for Hessischer Rundfunk and together with others chaired the politics show 3 zwei eins.

Political activities
Jochimsen only became politically active in 2002, after her retirement. She has complained that the former German Democratic Republic and the successor of the Socialist Unity Party of Germany, then named Party of Democratic Socialism (PDS), was being "stigmatized" after the fall of the communist regime in 1989.

In the 2002 Bundestag election, she was the top candidate of the Party for Democratic Socialism in Hesse. However, she was not elected. In 2005, she was nominated by the Party for Democratic Socialism in Thuringia in the former East Germany, and was elected. There, she proposed to abolish October 3 (the date of the reunification of Germany) as the national holiday, and instead introduce May 8, as a national holiday commemorating German defeat in World War II. In September 2009, she was denied access to the Ministry of Defence by the military police on the occasion of the dedication of a monument to German soldiers who were killed in action on missions abroad.

She was nominated by her party for President of Germany in the 2010 election. She opposed Christian Wulff, the candidate of the governing Christian Democratic Union, Christian Social Union of Bavaria and Free Democratic Party, as well as Joachim Gauck, the candidate of the Social Democratic Party of Germany and the Greens, and the candidate of the National Democratic Party of Germany, Frank Rennicke.

Following her nomination, Jochimsen opined that the German Democratic Republic was "not a state of injustice per definition", despite "committing inexcusable injustice towards its citizens".

Like the other members of the Bundestag parliamentary group of the Left Party, she is under surveillance by the Federal Office for the Protection of the Constitution.

Awards

Before she started her political activities, she received several professional awards for her work as a journalist.

 1971: Adolf Grimme Award
 1981: Alexander Zinn Award
 1984: Prix Italia
 2000: Hedwig Dohm Certificate
 2001: Hessian Order of Merit

References

1936 births
Living people
Politicians from Nuremberg
Members of the Bundestag for Thuringia
German journalists
German women journalists
Hessischer Rundfunk people
Aufstehen
Candidates for President of Germany
21st-century German politicians
Recipients of the Cross of the Order of Merit of the Federal Republic of Germany
Members of the Bundestag for The Left
21st-century German women